There are two rivers named Floriano River in Brazil:

 Floriano River (Paraíba)
 Floriano River (Paraná)

See also
 Floriano (disambiguation)